Eastwoodia is a North American genus of plants in the family Asteraceae. It contains the single species Eastwoodia elegans, a flower known by the common name yellow mock aster or yellow aster. It is endemic to California.  This plant is found only on the grasslands and hillsides of central California, from the Bay Area south to the Tehachapis.

Eastwoodia elegansis is a shrub which sends up several erect and branched stems up to 100 cm (40 inches) tall. One plant can produce several yellow flower heads, each containing as many as 40 disc florets but no ray florets. The stems have a shredding bark and small leaves rarely more than 5 cm (2 inches) long.

The genus was named for the Canadian-American botanist Alice Eastwood, 1859–1953.

References

External links
 Calflora Database: Eastwoodia elegans (Eastwoodia,  Yellow aster, Yellow mock aster)
Manual eFlora (TJM2) treatment of Eastwoodia elegans
USDA Plants Profile for Eastwoodia elegans
UC Photos gallery of Eastwoodia elegans

Astereae
Endemic flora of California
Natural history of the Central Valley (California)
~
Taxa named by Townshend Stith Brandegee
Monotypic Asteraceae genera
Flora without expected TNC conservation status